Jana Island is an island located in the Eastern Province of Saudi Arabia. It is located in the Persian Gulf, about 20 km northeast of the port and industrial city of Jubail. Despite the enormous damage to the coastal region of Saudi Arabia during the Second Gulf War, it served again in 1995 as a favorite nesting site for the green sea turtle.

References 

Islands of the Persian Gulf
Islands of Saudi Arabia